Otocinclus arnoldi is a species of armoured catfish native to South America, where it occurs in the lower río Paraná drainage, in the lower and middle rio Uruguai and in the río de La Plata.

Named in honor of German aquarist Johann Paul Arnold (1869–1952), who "presented" type specimen to the British Museum.

References

Hypoptopomatini
Taxa named by Charles Tate Regan
Freshwater fish of South America
Fish described in 1909